Rodney Ewing (born 1964) is an African-American interdisciplinary visual artist. He lives in New York City as of 2022, and formerly lived in San Francisco, California.

Early life and education 
Rodney Ewing was born in 1964 in Baton Rouge, Louisiana. His father was a Vietnam veteran, who also served 20 years in the United States Air Force. Rodney Ewing also served in the military and is a Desert Storm veteran. Ewing’s father introduced him to art through comic books. Ewing also said he went to schools that had strong art programs.

Ewing received his Bachelor of Fine Art: Printmaking, Louisiana State University, Baton Rouge, Louisiana in 1989; and his Master of Fine Arts: Printmaking, West Virginia University, Morgantown, West Virginia in 1992.

Work 
Ewing's work explores identity, narrative, history, space, displacement, physical vulnerability and violence. Ewing's work involves extensive subject research. Often Ewing uses once-common, but now little-known historical objects. He also uses first person narratives. Ewing's art explores and translates the literal and emotional dimensions of these subjects. Along with historical images of artifacts and victims of violence, Ewing often layers in quotations by different writers. Reading these quotations, sometimes obscured by the visual elements of the piece, creates another experience that is unique and nuanced within the context of the print, sculpture or installation. He employs different methods to draw the viewer in, literally and figuratively, toward the piece and immerses the viewer in a reorienting experience of images, words and ideas.

Ewing's work has referenced James Baldwin, Henry Box Brown, Colson Whitehead, George Stinney, Charles Moore, San Francisco Redevelopment after Japanese Internment, Ralph Ellison, Petrus Camper, and Saul Williams. His artwork is in public museum collections, including at Harvard Art Museums, Fairfield University Art Museum, and the Philadelphia Museum of Art.

Reviews 
“Rodney Ewing’s drawings, installations, and mixed media works focus on his need to intersect body and place, memory and fact to re-examine human histories, cultural conditions, and events. With his work he is pursuing a narrative that requires us to be present and intimate.” ...much of [Ewing's] work is about empowering the audience and giving them opportunities to recognize their own agency

Residencies and select exhibitions 

 2020, Close to Home, Creativity in Crisis, San Francisco Museum of Modern Art, San Francisco, California
 2020, The Space Program, San Francisco, California
 2019, Project Space: Headlands Center for the Arts, Marin County, California
 2019, Museum of the African Diaspora, Smithsonian Museum Affiliate, San Francisco, California
 2019, artist residency at Bemis Center for Contemporary Arts, Omaha, Nebraska
 2018, Artifacts: On War & Survival at the National Veterans Art Museum, Chicago, Illinois
 2018, Djerassi Artists Residency, Woodside, California
 2018, Sanctuary City: For Liberty and Justice for Some? San Francisco Arts Commission Gallery, San Francisco, California
 2017–2018, artist residency, Recology, San Francisco, California
 2017, Hangar Lisbon, Lisbon, Portugal
 2015, artist-in-residency at de Young Museum, San Francisco, California
 2015–2016, San Francisco Arts Commission award recipient 
 One Less Too Many, PASS7, Lisbon, Portugal
 Reconstruct, Long Island University, Brooklyn, Brooklyn, NY
 Beyond Printmaking 5, Texas Tech University, Lubbock, TX
 Never Alone: Exploring the Bonds Between and With Members of the Armed Forces, San Francisco Arts Commission Gallery, San Francisco, California

Select works 

 Sum of My Father (2018), sculpture made of wool military blankets, silkscreen, and engraved name plates
 Between Worlds: Portals (2016), installation explores the history of displacement and resilience of African Americans with doors, windows and words
 Longitude and Latitude (2019), explores the geographic and mnemonic landscapes of historical and social events

References 

American printmakers
Living people
Mixed-media artists
Interdisciplinary artists
African-American printmakers
21st-century African-American people
1964 births